{{DISPLAYTITLE:C21H30O4}}
The molecular formula C21H30O4 (molar mass: 346.46 g/mol, exact mass: 346.2144 u) may refer to:

 Algestone, a pregnane steroid
 Corticosterone, a steroid hormone
 18-Hydroxy-11-deoxycorticosterone, a steroid hormone
 Deoxycortisols
 11-Deoxycortisol, a steroid hormone
 17-Deoxycortisol, a steroid 
 21-Deoxycortisol, a steroid 
 MP-2001, a synthetic steroid
 Cannabimovone, a phytocannabinoid
 Cannabitriol, a phytocannabinoid
 8,11-Dihydroxytetrahydrocannabinol, a metabolite of THC